The National Association of State Department of Agriculture (NASDA) is an American organization of state departments of agriculture.

Founded in 1915, NASDA's mission is to represent the state departments of agriculture in the development, implementation, and communication of sound public policy and programs which support and promote the American agricultural industry, while protecting consumers and the environment.

The National Agricultural Law Center (NALC) and NASDA have formed a partnership.

References

Further reading
 USDA
 WASDA
 Federal Environmental Laws Affecting Agriculture

External links
 Official Website

Agricultural organizations based in the United States
1915 establishments in the United States
Organizations established in 1915
Government-related professional associations in the United States